Resurrection is the first studio album by E-17. The album was released on 16 November 1998.

"Each Time" and "Betcha Can't Wait" were released as singles. "Each Time" peaked at No. 2 on the UK Singles Chart, while "Betcha Can't Wait" peaked at No. 12.

Greatest
In 2013, Resurrection was re-released via the Demon Music Group under the name Greatest with a slightly re-arranged track listing.

Track listing
"Each Time"
"Sleeping in My Head"
"Tell Me What You Want"
"Betcha Can't Wait"
"Anything (Interlude)"
"Daddy's Gonna Love You"
"I'm Here for You"
"Ain't No Stoppin'"
"Falling in Love Again"
"Whatever You Need"
"Coming Home" (Interlude)
"I Miss You"
"Another Time"
"Lately"

A hidden track titled "Start It" is in the pre-gap before "Each Time". The CD can be rewound on most CD players to 4:27.

Charts

Certifications

References

1998 albums
East 17 albums